Wayland Parrott Flowers Jr. (November 26, 1939 – October 11, 1988) was an American actor, comedian and  puppeteer. Flowers was best known for the comedy act he created with his puppet Madame. His performances as "Wayland Flowers and Madame" were a major national success on stage and on screen in the 1970s and 1980s.

Career
Wayland Parrott Flowers Jr. was born November 26, 1939 in Dawson, Georgia, and was raised there. Flowers created Madame in the mid-1960s. Flowers' first big break was an appearance on The Andy Williams Show. The character of Madame is an "outrageous old broad" who entertains with double entendres and witty comebacks. Bedecked in fabulous evening wear and "summer diamonds" ("Some are diamonds; some are not"), Madame's look is based on movie stars such as Gloria Swanson. Madame may have been based on a Washington, DC gay icon, waitress and restaurant hostess Margo MacGregor.

Madame's many TV appearances included Laugh-In; a long run on the game show Hollywood Squares (replacing Paul Lynde in The Center Square); a recurring comedy skit on Solid Gold; a regular on ABC's short-lived summer replacement show called Keep on Truckin', TV guest spots; and as the star of her own syndicated 1982 sitcom, Madame's Place.

Flowers and Madame were in the center square on the final NBC episode of Hollywood Squares in June 1980; host Peter Marshall asked Madame the final game question of the daytime series, which was "Mozart, Beethoven, Schubert and Strauss lived in the same place. Where did they all live?" Madame's "comic" answer: "At the YMCA!" Then her "serious" answer: Germany. (The correct answer: Austria.)

Flowers' other puppets included Crazy Mary (an escapee from Bellevue mental hospital), Jiffy (a Harlem harlot with a heart of brass), Macklehoney (a crotchety, retired vaudeville comedian). His puppet Smedley worked with Marlo Thomas on Free to Be... You and Me.

Personal life
Flowers was one of the first mainstream entertainers who was openly gay.

Death
Sometime during his four-year stint on Solid Gold, Flowers was diagnosed with HIV. He did not publicly announce his diagnosis and continued to perform. Flowers eventually developed Kaposi's sarcoma, an AIDS-related cancer. On September 2, 1988, he collapsed onstage while performing at Harrah's in Lake Tahoe. After a brief hospitalization, he returned to his hometown of Dawson, Georgia, where he visited family. Upon returning to Los Angeles, he moved into the hospice Hughes House for palliative care. On October 11, 1988, Flowers died at Hughes House of complications from AIDS-related Kaposi's sarcoma at the age of 48. His remains were cremated at Grand View Memorial Park & Crematory in Glendale, California, and shipped back to his hometown of Dawson, Georgia, where they were interred at Cedar Hills Cemetery.

Flowers bequeathed his estate to his manager, Marlena Shell.

Legacy
Flowers co-wrote the book Madame: My Misbegotten Memoirs, with Gary Simmons which was published in 1983.

Ten years after Flowers's death, Madame returned to the stage with entertainer Rick Skye. After appearances on several television shows, performances of "It's Madame with an E" began November 15, 2008, at Resorts Atlantic City. During 2010, the show also toured the US.

Flowers inspired the first name of Waylon Smithers, a fictional character on the animated TV series The Simpsons, who later came out as gay.

American drag queen, Raja Gemini, performed as Madame on RuPaul's Drag Race All Stars (season 7) on the show's Snatch Game, a game inspired by the TV game show Match Game.

References

External links

 
 
 Wayland Flowers and Madame at the Internet Archive

1939 births
1988 deaths
AIDS-related deaths in California
American comedy writers
American male comedians
20th-century American comedians
American male film actors
American male stage actors
American male television actors
American puppeteers
Burials in Georgia (U.S. state)
American gay actors
Gay comedians
LGBT people from Georgia (U.S. state)
Male actors from Georgia (U.S. state)
Nightclub performers
People from Dawson, Georgia
Young Harris College alumni
20th-century American male actors
20th-century American LGBT people
American LGBT comedians